Rosa's Wedding is a 2020 Spanish comedy film directed by Icíar Bollaín, starring Candela Peña and Sergi López.

The film was nominated for eight Goya Awards and nine Feroz Awards.

Plot 
Rosa, about to turn 45, combines her job as a movie seamstress with the pressure of helping her demanding family. She reaches breaking point and realises she has always lived her life to serve everyone else. Desperate, she is compelled to take the sudden decision to leave everything behind and focus on herself. She plans to symbolically marry herself, and pursue her dream of starting her own business. However, many obstacles, including her father, siblings and daughter, stand in the way of her joining herself in holy matrimony and beginning to live her life.

Cast
 Candela Peña as Rosa
 Sergi López as Armando
 Nathalie Poza as Violeta
 Ramón Barea as Antonio
 Paula Usero as Lidia

Reception
Rosa's Wedding received positive reviews from film critics.

Awards

References

External links
 
 

2020 films
2020s Spanish-language films
2020 comedy films
Films directed by Icíar Bollaín
2020s Spanish films
Spanish comedy films